Zebiniso Sanginovna Rustamova (born 29 January 1955 in Dushanbe, Tajik SSR, Soviet Union) is an archer from the Soviet Union. She competed for the Soviet Union in the 1976 Summer Olympics held in Montreal, Canada in the individual event where she finished in third place. She won a world championship in 1975 with a record.

She currently coaches young sportsmen and helps old people and indigent families in northern Tajikistan.

References

External links
Sports-reference

1955 births
Sportspeople from Dushanbe
Tajikistani female archers
Soviet female archers
Olympic archers of the Soviet Union
Olympic bronze medalists for the Soviet Union
Archers at the 1976 Summer Olympics
Living people
Olympic medalists in archery
Medalists at the 1976 Summer Olympics